Luv Ya Bunches is a 2009 children's novel by author Lauren Myracle. The book was first published on October 1, 2009 through Amulet Books and focuses on the friendship between four elementary school girls with similar floral themed names. It's very popular among girls ages 9–13, and is known for its girly and interesting story plot.  Luv Ya Bunches has received some controversy over its inclusion of same-sex parents, with Scholastic requesting that Myracle remove the couple and some objectionable language before it could be sold at their book fairs. Myracle removed some of the language, but refused to replace the lesbian couple with a heterosexual one. Scholastic later retracted their statement, saying that they would offer the book at book fairs but would not sell the book at ones held in elementary schools.

Plot summary 
The main characters - Yasaman (meaning "jasmine" in Turkish), Violet, Katie-Rose, and Camilla - are each named after flowers, and all are entering fifth grade.

Katie-Rose is the youngest of three siblings and one of the most unpopular girls in her grade. Her only friend is her neighbor Max, but she yearns to befriend popular girl Camilla “Milla” Swanson, whom she knows from Pioneer Camp. Although Milla reciprocates the interest, she is ordered by her friend Modessa not to hang out with Katie-Rose.

Milla is an only child with lesbian moms, Abigail and Joyce. Her best friends are the cruel and popular Modessa and Quin, who often pressure Milla into joining them in bullying others, though Milla does not enjoy doing so. A frequent target of Modessa’s bullying is the sweet but clumsy Yasaman, a Muslim girl who is also a computer genius. Yasaman’s younger sister Nigar (pronounced Nee-GAR) gets bullied due to her name reading similarly to a racist slur.

Violet is a shy girl who has recently moved from Georgia to California with her father. Her mother suffers from bipolar disorder and has been committed to a psychiatric ward, causing Violet to feel lonely and outcast. She temporarily joins Modessa's clique and becomes friends with Milla.

Katie-Rose befriends Yasaman, and the latter introduces her to a social media website she has created, temporarily entitled BlahBlahSomethingSomething.com. Meanwhile, Milla starts to feel jaded with Modessa’s hostile treatment of her and begins talking to Katie-Rose behind Modessa's back. Katie-Rose introduces Milla to the site.

Milla loses a bobble-head turtle whom she has affectionately named Tally and keeps as a good luck charm, which Violet finds and keeps, unaware of its origins. Once she finds out, she plans to return it to Milla without her knowing that Violet had ever had it. During class, she hides Tally in Modessa’s seat, assuming the latter will find and return it. However, Modessa puts Tally in Katie-Rose's backpack to frame her for stealing it. Katie-Rose and Milla have an argument over this, which Violet witnesses, but does not intervene despite knowing the truth.

Eventually, Violet tells Milla the truth, and they decide to stop being friends with Modessa and Quin. Together, all four girls seek revenge on the two by putting mud in Modessa’s ice cream and framing Quin for doing so. Their plan succeeds and Modessa and Quin end up falling out with each other, as well as in trouble with scolding teachers. Milla, Violet, Katie-Rose, and Yasaman find out that they are all named after flowers and dub themselves the "flower friends forever,” abbreviated to FFFs. Yasaman renames her website, which all four girls now regularly use to communicate, to “LuvYaBunches.com”.

Reception
Critical reception for the book was mostly positive, with Booklist giving it a positive review. Publishers Weekly gave a mixed review of the book, saying that Luv Ya Bunches "sends something of a mixed message about the acceptability of teasing as the girls’ plot their own prank in response to Modessa’s machinations. Still, readers will find the girls’ voices enticing and should be able to relate to their conflicts and inner anxieties."

References

External links 
 Official site
 Author's site

2009 American novels
American children's novels
2009 children's books
Children's books with LGBT themes
Amulet Books books